A total lunar eclipse took place between 27 and 28 September 2015. It was seen on Sunday evening, 27 September, in the Americas; while in Europe, Africa, and the Middle East, it was seen in the early hours of Monday morning, 28 September. It was the latter of two total lunar eclipses in 2015, and the final in a tetrad (four total lunar eclipses in series). Other eclipses in the tetrad are those of 15 April 2014, 8 October 2014, and 4 April 2015.

The Moon appeared larger than normal, because the Moon was just 1 hour past its closest approach to Earth in 2015 at mid-eclipse, sometimes called a supermoon. The Moon's apparent diameter was larger than 34' viewed straight overhead, just off the coast of northeast Brazil.

The total lunar eclipse was darker than expected, possibly due to ash left behind from eruptions of the Calbuco volcano in April 2015.

Background 

A lunar eclipse occurs when the Moon passes within Earth's umbra (shadow). As the eclipse begins, Earth's shadow first darkens the Moon slightly.  Then, the shadow begins to "cover" part of the Moon, turning it a dark red-brown color (typically – the color can vary based on atmospheric conditions). The Moon appears to be reddish because of Rayleigh scattering (the same effect that causes sunsets to appear reddish) and the refraction of that light by Earth's atmosphere into its umbra.

The following simulation shows the approximate appearance of the Moon passing through Earth's shadow. The Moon's brightness is exaggerated within the umbral shadow. The northern portion of the Moon was closest to the center of the shadow, making it darkest, and most red in appearance.

Visibility 

The eclipse was visible over Europe, the Middle East, Africa, and America.

Timing

† The Moon was not visible during this part of the eclipse in this time zone.

* The penumbral phase of the eclipse changes the appearance of the Moon only slightly and is generally not noticeable.

Gallery

Supermoon

This eclipsed moon appeared 12.9% larger in diameter than the April 2015 lunar eclipse, measured as 29.66' and 33.47' in diameter from earth's center, as compared in these simulated images.

A supermoon is the coincidence of a full moon or a new moon with the closest approach the Moon makes to the Earth on its elliptical orbit, resulting in the largest apparent size of the lunar disk as seen from Earth. This was the last supermoon lunar eclipse until 31 January 2018.

Related eclipses

Eclipses of 2015 
 A total solar eclipse on 20 March.
 A total lunar eclipse on 4 April.
 A partial solar eclipse on 13 September.
 A total lunar eclipse on 28 September.

The eclipse was one of four lunar eclipses in a short-lived series at the descending node of the Moon's orbit.

The lunar year series repeats after 12 lunations, or 354 days (shifting back about 10 days in sequential years). Because of the date shift, Earth's shadow will be about 11 degrees west in sequential events.

Saros series
It is part of Saros series 137.

Half-Saros cycle
A lunar eclipse will be preceded and followed by solar eclipses by 9 years and 5.5 days (a half saros). This lunar eclipse is related to two annular solar eclipses of solar saros 144.

See also 
List of lunar eclipses and List of 21st-century lunar eclipses

References

External links

 
 Hermit eclipse: 2015-09-28

2015-09
2015 in science
Articles containing video clips
September 2015 events